Illinois Route 29 (IL 29) is a two to four lane state highway that runs south from U.S. Route 6/Illinois Route 89 at Spring Valley to U.S. Route 51/Illinois Route 16 at Pana, running through Pekin, Peoria and Springfield. The nearest major north–south highway, Interstate 39, runs parallel to Illinois 29, but approximately fifty miles to the east.

Route description 

Illinois 29 runs near the right bank (going down stream) which is (north and west) of the Illinois River from Spring Valley to Peoria.  Starting at U.S. 6/Illinois 89 at the north edge of Spring Valley, the road passes through the small towns of Putnam and Henry, intersecting Illinois Route 18 at Henry. In Sparland, Illinois 29 intersects Illinois Route 17. It then runs beneath the bluff at Hopewell before becoming 4th Street, the main north–south artery through Chillicothe.

From the north end of Illinois Route 6 at Mossville south through Peoria and Peoria Heights, Route 29 is named Galena Road until it crosses U.S. Route 150 at the McClugage Bridge; from there the road is named Adams Street.  In downtown Peoria, 29 splits from Adams Street onto Interstate 74 on the Murray Baker Bridge, where it crosses the Illinois River to East Peoria.

In East Peoria, Route 29 splits from Interstate 74 and proceeds south, entering Creve Coeur on Main Street and providing an interchange with Interstate 474.  It enters Pekin as 8th Street and forks off as 5th Street before a short concurrency with Illinois Route 9 near the Pekin Bridge.  Splitting onto 2nd Street (southbound) and 3rd Street (northbound) before crossing the bridge, Route 29 exits Pekin as 2nd Street, passing the Federal Correctional Institution, Pekin, and from there goes substantially directly south through Mason City to Springfield.

Route 29 enters Springfield at the Abraham Lincoln Capital Airport, and runs around the north and east sides of the city. After leaving Springfield at an interchange with Interstate 55/Interstate 72/U.S. Route 36, Route 29 runs southeast through Taylorville, passing the end of Illinois Route 104 and crossing Illinois Route 48, then ending at U.S. Route 51/Illinois Route 16 in Pana.

History 
Route 29 was established in 1918, and ran from DePue to Peoria. It was extended twice over Illinois Route 24 in 1936 and 1940, and in 1942 replaced an old alignment of U.S. Route 6 from Bureau Junction to Spring Valley.

The routing of Route 29 through Peoria was changed in 2012. That same year, U.S. Route 24 was rerouted over the river along a more southwestern alignment. 29 was relocated from the Cedar Street Bridge to the Murray Baker Bridge, which carries Interstate 74.

Major intersections

See also 
Bridges in Peoria, Illinois

References

External links 

 Illinois 29 Study
 Illinois Highway Ends - Illinois Route 29

Ronald Reagan Trail
029
U.S. Route 6
Transportation in Christian County, Illinois
Transportation in Sangamon County, Illinois
Transportation in Menard County, Illinois
Transportation in Mason County, Illinois
Transportation in Tazewell County, Illinois
Transportation in Peoria County, Illinois
Transportation in Marshall County, Illinois
Transportation in Putnam County, Illinois
Transportation in Bureau County, Illinois